John William Griffith (1789–1855) was an English architect and surveyor.

Career

Surveyor
From his office at 16 Finsbury Place South, John Griffith held several surveying posts in the City of London and Islington areas: for the London Estates of St John's College, Cambridge and James Rhodes, and for the Parish of St Botolph, Aldersgate (the church of which he may have enlarged and enhanced circa 1830). In Islington, for the James Rhodes Estate, in the 1820s he prepared the schedules, petitions and plans for development in the Duncan Terrace area.

Architect
Apart from his plans for Rhodes' houses in Islington, he was also responsible for the design of many houses in Hornsey, Kentish Town and Highgate as well as the Islington Parochial Schools (1815) and the South Islington Proprietary School, in a classical style (1836).

The Greek Revival architecture of the principal buildings of Cemetery of All Souls, Kensal Green have been attributed to John William Griffith, however they are almost certainly designed by John Griffith of Finsbury (1796-1888), who was one of the three architect shareholders of the General Cemetery Company (the others were A.C.Pugin and Thomas Willson). John Griffith of Finsbury was initially responsible for the overall layout and planting of the grounds, including the surrounding wall and railings.

References

1789 births
1855 deaths
Burials at Highgate Cemetery
19th-century English architects
Greek Revival architects
Architects from London